Blue Ridge High School is a small, rural public high school located in New Milford, Susquehanna County, Pennsylvania. It is  the sole high school operated by Blue Ridge School District. In 2015, enrollment was reported as 315 pupils in 9th through 12th grades. The school employed 29 teachers.

Extracurriculars
The Blue Ridge School District offers a wide variety of clubs, activities and an extensive sports program. The school offers the following clubs: National Honor Society, Student Council, Leo Club and Middle School and High School Yearbook. Students can earn one English credit working on the yearbook.

Sports
The district funds:
Varsity

Boys
Baseball - A
Basketball- AA
Cross country - A
Golf - AA
Soccer - A
Track and field - AA
Volleyball - AA
Wrestling - AA
 
Girls
Basketball - AA
Cross country - A
Soccer (fall) - A
Softball - A
Track and field - AA
Volleyball - A

Middle school sports

Boys
Baseball
Basketball
Cross country
Soccer
Track and field
Wrestling	
 
Girls
Basketball
Cross country
Softball 
Track and field

According to PIAA directory July 2015

References

Public high schools in Pennsylvania
Education in Susquehanna County, Pennsylvania